Šlapanice is a town in Brno-Country District in the South Moravian Region of the Czech Republic. It has about 7,600 inhabitants.

Administrative parts
The village od Bedřichovice is an administrative part of Šlapanice.

Geography
It lies in the Dyje–Svratka Valley on the stream Říčka.

History
The first written mention of Šlapanice is from 1235.

Demographics

Economy
The largest employer based in the town's territory is CCI Czech Republic, a branch of IMI plc. It produces valves for the oil, petrochemical and energy industries.

Notable people
Alois Kalvoda (1875–1934), painter
František Šterc (1912–1978), footballer
Vratislav Štěpánek (1930–2013), clergyman and bishop; died here
Libuše Šafránková (1953–2021), actress

Twin towns – sister cities

Šlapanice is twinned with:
 Braine-l'Alleud, Belgium

References

External links

Cities and towns in the Czech Republic
Populated places in Brno-Country District